Buyck's Bluff Archeological Site is a historic archaeological site located near St. Matthews, Calhoun County, South Carolina.  The site contains evidence of human occupation beginning with Paleo-Indian, continuing through the Archaic and Woodland Periods. It probably served as a base camp through most of its occupation.

It was listed in the National Register of Historic Places in 1979.

References

Archaeological sites on the National Register of Historic Places in South Carolina
National Register of Historic Places in Calhoun County, South Carolina